Primera División A (Méxican First A Division) is a Mexican football tournament. This season was composed of Invierno 2002 and Verano 2003. Irapuato was the winner of the promotion to First Division after winning León in the promotion playoff.

Changes for the 2002–03 season
Due to the creation of Jaguares de Chiapas, Atlético Chiapas moved to Mérida and renamed Atlético Yucatán.
Querétaro F.C. was promoted to First Division after bought the La Piedad franchise. To occupy the site left by Querétaro, the owners created a new Irapuato F.C. franchise.
Toros Neza was bought by new owners, for that reason the team was relocated to Nuevo Laredo and its renamed Gavilanes de Nuevo Laredo.
Potros Zitácuaro was relocated to Mexico City and renamed Potros DF, as an Atlante F.C. reserve team.
Due to the lack of local economic support, Tampico Madero was sold, the new owners moved the team to La Piedad, to revive the local team that had lost its place in Liga MX.
Gallos de Aguascalientes had to sell its franchise, because its stadium was demolished and the alternative presented by the club was not approved by the Femexfut. C.D. Guadalajara bought the team and refounded the C.D. Tapatío based in Guadalajara.
Bachilleres was sold, the owners argue sports and administrative reasons. The new board relocated the team to Orizaba and renamed as Albinegros de Orizaba.
Club León was relegated from First Division.
Cihuatlán was promoted from Second Division.

Changes for the Verano 2003 tournament
Potros DF was relocated to Tapachula and renamed to Jaguares de Tapachula.
Albinegros de Orizaba was relocated to Villahermosa and renamed Lagartos de Tabasco.
La Piedad was relocated to Celaya and renamed Celaya F.C.
Gavilanes de Nuevo Laredo was disaffiliated by the FMF, for that reason, the team did not play in this tournament.

Stadiums and locations

Clausura 2003 new teams

Invierno 2002

Group league tables

Group 1

Group 2

Group 3

Group 4

General league table

Results

Reclassification series

First leg

Second leg

Liguilla 

(p.t.) The team was classified by its best position in the general table

Quarter-finals

First leg

Second leg

Semi-finals

First leg

Second leg

Final

First leg

Second leg

Top scorers

Verano 2003

Group league tables

Group 1

Group 2

Group 3

Group 4

General league table

Results

Reclassification series

First leg

Second leg

Liguilla

(p.t.) The team was classified by its best position in the general table

Quarter-finals

First leg

Second leg

Semi-finals

First leg

Second leg

Final

First leg

Second leg

Top scorers

Relegation table

Promotion final
The promotion final faced Irapuato against León to determine the winner of the First Division Promotion. Irapuato was the winner. Before the celebration of the games a controversy was unleashed, because it was made believe that the board of the Club Leon had acquired the Irapuato. Subsequently, an armed command supposedly paid by the owners of the León occupied the Sergio León Chávez stadium, a few days later the fans recovered the building accompanied by police and military elements.

First leg

Second leg

References

2002–03 in Mexican football
Mexico
Mexico
Ascenso MX seasons